Adam Hills (10 August 1880 – June 1941) was a Labour Party politician in England.

Hills was active in the National Union of Railwaymen, and also the Labour Party, for which he was elected to Newcastle City Council in 1934.  He was Member of Parliament (MP) for Pontefract from 1935 until his death in 1941 aged 60.

References

External links 
 

1880 births
1941 deaths
Councillors in Newcastle upon Tyne
Labour Party (UK) MPs for English constituencies
National Union of Railwaymen-sponsored MPs
UK MPs 1935–1945